Michael Brunner (born 11 February 1995 in St. Gallen, Switzerland) is a Swiss curler from Appenzell. He currently skips his own team out of Bern.

Teams

Men's

Mixed

Mixed doubles

Personal life
He started curling in 2001 when he was 6 years old.

Grand Slam record

References

External links

Curling World Cup profile
 

Living people
1995 births
Sportspeople from St. Gallen (city)
Swiss male curlers
Swiss curling champions
Competitors at the 2019 Winter Universiade
Curlers at the 2012 Winter Youth Olympics
Youth Olympic gold medalists for Switzerland
People from Appenzell Innerrhoden
21st-century Swiss people